John Dawson (1762March 31, 1814) was a Virginian lawyer, soldier and politician who served in the War of 1812 and a term in the Continental Congress as well as several terms in the U.S. House of Representatives before his death in office.

Early life and education
Born in the Colony of Virginia, Dawson graduated from Harvard University in 1782, studied law and was admitted to the bar.

Career
Known for his stylish attire and red hair, "Beau" Dawson was a good friend of, and prolific correspondent with, James Madison, for Dawson's stepfather Judge Joseph Jones raised Madison's good friend (and sometimes political opponent) James Monroe after his father's death. Dawson served in the Virginia House of Delegates from 1786 to 1789 and was also elected a member of the Continental Congress in 1788.

A delegate to the Virginia Convention in 1788, Dawson opposed ratification, aligning himself with Monroe, Patrick Henry and George Mason, although that convention as a whole ratified the United States Constitution. The following year  Dawson was selected to Virginia's privy council and served in that executive branch capacity for several years. In 1796, Dawson was elected to the United States House of Representatives as a Democratic-Republican and served from 1797 to his death in 1814. In 1801 President John Adams selected Dawson to transmit dispatches to the Government of France, and Dawson thus averted war with the one-time ally. Dawson became chairman of the Committee on the District of Columbia from 1813 to 1814, as well as served as an aide to Generals Jacob Brown and future President Andrew Jackson during the War of 1812.

Death and legacy

Dawson died in Washington, D.C., on March 31, 1814, and was interred there in the Congressional Cemetery.

See also 
 List of United States Congress members who died in office (1790–1899)

References 

1762 births
1814 deaths
Continental Congressmen from Virginia
18th-century American politicians
Delegates to the Virginia Ratifying Convention
Members of the Virginia House of Delegates
Virginia lawyers
Harvard College alumni
People from Virginia in the War of 1812
Burials at the Congressional Cemetery
Democratic-Republican Party members of the United States House of Representatives from Virginia
19th-century American lawyers
19th-century American politicians
18th-century American lawyers